Manolache Costache Epureanu (1823–1880) was twice the Prime Minister of Romania both as a representative of the Conservative Party and of the National Liberal Party, more specifically for the first time in 1870 (20 April–14 December) and for the second time in 1876 (6 May–5 August).

Biography
Born in Bârlad, Moldavia, he studied in Heidelberg, Germany and returned to Moldavia to participate in the 1848 revolutionary movement, being part of the ad hoc committee.

In 1866, he was the president of the council which decided to invite a foreign dynasty to rule Romania. In 1871, during the Lascăr Catargiu conservative government, Epureanu was the Minister of Justice between October 1872 and March 1873. He then switched to the opposition and in 1876, he was a national liberal Prime Minister, but later he switched again to the Conservative Party.

He published Chestia locuitorilor privită din punctul de vedere al Regulamentului organic (1866) and Despre pretinsa rescumpărare a căilor ferate (1879).

He was the father of Elena Bibescu. He died in Schlangenbad, Duchy of Nassau, which is now in Germany.

References
 Dimitrie R. Rosetti (1897) Dicționarul contimporanilor, Editura Lito-Tipografiei "Populara"

1823 births
1880 deaths
People from Bârlad
Conservative Party (Romania, 1880–1918) politicians
Prime Ministers of the Principality of Wallachia
Prime Ministers of the Principality of Moldavia
Prime Ministers of Romania
Romanian Ministers of Agriculture
Romanian Ministers of Interior
Romanian Ministers of Justice
Romanian Ministers of Public Works
Presidents of the Chamber of Deputies (Romania)
Members of the Chamber of Deputies (Romania)
Members of the Senate of Romania
People of the Revolutions of 1848